La Esperanza (the name is Spanish for "hope") is a town and parish in northern Ecuador in Imbabura Province, Ibarra Canton.

La Esperanza parish had a population of 6,677 in the 2001 census and 7,363 in the 2010 census.

In the late 1960s and 1970s, La Esperanza became known to hippies and celebrities for the magic mushrooms which grew there in profusion.

References

Populated places in Imbabura Province